Curtright, also known as White Sulfur Springs, is an unincorporated community in Cass County, Texas. It was founded in 1860 as White Sulfur Springs and renamed to Curtright in 1887. It had a post office from 1975 to  1890. By 1936, Curtright was a dispersed community.

References

Populated places established in 1860
Unincorporated communities in Cass County, Texas
Unincorporated communities in Texas